An Sung-Bin  (born 3 October 1988) is a South Korean footballer who plays for Gyeongnam FC in the K League 1.

Club career 
An started his career at Gyeongnam FC, joining in the 2010 K-League Draft. He made his debut in a match against Daejeon Citizen on 7 March 2010. An scored his first goal against Jeonbuk Hyundai Motors in the K-League Cup opening game, which Gyeongnam FC lost 1–2.

Career statistics

External links 

1988 births
Living people
South Korean footballers
Gyeongnam FC players
Ansan Mugunghwa FC players
FC Anyang players
K League 2 players
K League 1 players
Association football forwards
People from Namyangju
Sportspeople from Gyeonggi Province